Stuart Niven (born 24 December 1978) is a Scottish former professional footballer who played as a midfielder.

Career
Niven began his career in the Ipswich Town youth system. He made his senior debut for the club in a 3–1 win over Sheffield United on 14 September 1996. He made two appearances during the 1996–97 season.

He signed for Barnet in September 2000. He made 68 appearances for Barnet between 2000 and 2003.

References

External links

1978 births
Living people
Footballers from Glasgow
Scottish footballers
Association football midfielders
Ipswich Town F.C. players
Barnet F.C. players
Carlisle United F.C. players
Cambridge City F.C. players
Spennymoor Town F.C. players
Tow Law Town F.C. players
Durham City A.F.C. players
Shildon A.F.C. players
English Football League players
National League (English football) players